The 1933 World Fencing Championships were held in Budapest, Hungary.

Medal summary

Men's events

Women's events

References

World Fencing Championships
1933 in Hungarian sport
International fencing competitions hosted by Hungary
1930s in Budapest
International sports competitions in Budapest